North Carolina's 14th congressional district is a new congressional district in the United States House of Representatives created after the 2020 United States census. The newly created district was drawn by a three-judge panel in the Wake County Superior Court as part of a remedial map for the 2022 United States House of Representatives elections. It covers the southern half of Mecklenburg County and three-fourths of Gaston County. It includes most of Charlotte, as well as Gastonia, Mount Holly, and Belmont.

On paper, the district leans Democratic, due almost entirely to Charlotte swinging hard to the Democrats since the turn of the millennium. While Gaston County is heavily Republican, the district's share of Mecklenburg County has twice the population of the Gaston County portion.

The fourteenth district is currently represented by Jeff Jackson.

Statewide election results

List of members representing the district

Election results

2022

In popular culture 
In the 2012 political satire film The Campaign, Democratic Congressman Camden Brady represents North Carolina's then-fictional 14th congressional district.

See also 

 North Carolina's congressional districts
 List of United States congressional districts

References 

14
Constituencies established in 2023
2023 establishments in North Carolina